The British Tenpin Bowling Coaching Association (BTBCA) is a sub-section of the British Tenpin Bowling Association (BTBA) - the UK's Ten-pin bowling governing body.

Formation

Although associated under the umbrella group of the BTBA, the BTBCA is run solely by a committee, elected by the members annually at the Annual General Meeting, subject to their good standing with the BTBA.

The BTBCA Chairman reports annually to the BTBA, through the BTBCA President (the BTBA Director of National Coaching currently Arthur J McDonnell MSc).

BTBA Coaching Qualification
Within the BTBCA there are 4 levels to the BTBA Coaching Qualification. These include:

Phase I: Instructor: - approved to teach beginners.
Phase II Instructor: - approved to teach beginners and bowlers with a limited amount of experience in the Sport.
Phase III Coach: - approved to coach advanced bowlers including County and National levels.
Phase IV Coach: - approved to coach at all levels, coach education, Instructor mentoring and development, setting of standards for coaching.

BTBCA Aim
According to the BTBCA website, the main aim of the BTBCA is to provide a contact point for all BTBA qualified Instructors and Coaches.

There is a two-day BTBA coaching course. The passing of this course gives a basis of knowledge from which to work, however, the only way in which people can develop their skills in coaching, is through practical experience. In gaining this experience, questions often arise, for which the answers are not immediately clear.

Bowling organizations
Tenpin bowling in the United Kingdom
Sports organisations of the United Kingdom
Coaching associations